Epoché: A Journal for the History of Philosophy is a peer-reviewed academic journal about the history of philosophy and its essential role in contemporary philosophical discussion. The journal is open to different ideas and approaches, but it is particularly interested in articles from the continental or hermeneutic traditions. The journal is edited by Theodore George (Texas A&M University). It is published twice yearly on a non-profit in cooperation with the Philosophy Documentation Center and all issues are available online.

Indexing
Epoché is abstracted and indexed in Academic Search Premier, Article@INIST, Current Abstracts, Expanded Academic ASAP, Humanities International Index, Index Philosophicus, InfoTrac OneFile, International Bibliography of Periodical Literature (IBZ), MLA International Bibliography, Philosopher's Index, Philosophy Research Index, and PhilPapers.

See also 
 List of philosophy journals

External links 
 
 Philosophy Documentation Center

Biannual journals
English-language journals
History of philosophy journals
Publications established in 1993
Philosophy Documentation Center academic journals